C. portoricensis may refer to:

 Caesalpinia portoricensis, a flowering plant
 Calliandra portoricensis, a perennial tree
 Calyptranthes portoricensis, a plant endemic to Puerto Rico
 Canna portoricensis, a garden plant
 Clidemia portoricensis, a flowering plant
 Cnicus portoricensis, a thistle that is widespread in Mexico and the West Indies
 Coccocrater portoricensis, a deepwater limpet
 Colliuris portoricensis, a ground beetle
 Condylostylus portoricensis, a long-legged fly
 Contopus portoricensis, a tyrant flycatcher
 Crescentia portoricensis, a perennial evergreen
 Critonia portoricensis, a flowering plant
 Cyathea portoricensis, a tree fern
 Cyclura portoricensis, a rock iguana
 Cynometra portoricensis, a tropical tree